Marco Saracini (1535–1574) was a Roman Catholic prelate who served as Bishop of Volterra (1574).

Biography
Marco Saracini was born in July 1535 in Arezzo, Italy.
On 15 January 1574, he was appointed during the papacy of Pope Gregory XIII as Bishop of Volterra.
On 24 Jan 1574, he was consecrated bishop by Felice Peretti Montalto, Bishop of Fermo, with Giacomo Lomellino del Canto, Archbishop of Palermo, and Adriano Fuscone, Bishop of Aquino, serving as co-consecrators. 
He served as Bishop of Volterra until his death on 21 September 1574 in Volterra, Italy.

References 

16th-century Italian Roman Catholic bishops
Bishops appointed by Pope Gregory XIII
1535 births
1574 deaths